Popov Island (Russian: Остров Попова) is an island in the Eugénie de Montijo Archipelago. It lies in Peter the Great Gulf, 20 km to the south of Zolotoy Rog between Reyneke and Russky Islands. It is named after admiral Andrey Alexandrovich Popov. Area is 12,4 km2. Population: 1316 (2005) in two settlements (Stark and Popova). Administratively the island is under Vladivostok's jurisdiction.

Gallery

Notes 

Islands of the Sea of Japan
Islands of Vladivostok
Islands of Primorsky Krai